Centro de Gradudados del Liceo Naval Militar, or simply Liceo Naval, is an Argentine sports club formed by graduates from Liceo Naval "Almirante Brown" (Almirante Brown Naval High School), one of the two educative institutions of the Argentine Navy. The field is located in Núñez, Buenos Aires, close to the Ciudad Universitaria.

Liceo Naval's senior rugby union team competes in Primera División B, the third division of the Unión de Rugby de Buenos Aires league system., while the women's field hockey team plays the Torneo Metropolitano, the main competition of Buenos Aires.

Other sports practised at Liceo Naval are football, rowing and tennis.

Honours
  Seven Tournament of the URBA: 2013

Notable players
Las Leonas: Rocío Sánchez Moccia
Los Pumas: Eduardo Simone, Carlos Ignacio Fernández Lobbe and Juan Martín Fernández Lobbe.
Pumas 7s: Nicolas Fernández Lobbe and Santiago Craig.
Youth rugby team of Argentina: Santiago Fiocca, Sebastian Buffa, Nicolas Azzorín, Guido Lofiego and Nacho Calles.
Argentina XV: Santiago Gilligan.
Pampas 7s: Diego Acuña.

Uniforms

References

External links
 
 Liceo Naval Hockey
 Children's rugby blog

Rugby clubs established in 1953
Rugby union clubs in Buenos Aires Province
Field hockey clubs in Buenos Aires Province